The 2005 WTA Tour Championships, also known as the Sony Ericsson Championships, was a women's round robin tennis tournament played on indoor hard courts at the Staples Center in Los Angeles, United States. It was the 35th edition of the year-end singles championships, the 30th edition of the year-end doubles championships, and was part of the 2005 WTA Tour. The tournament was held between November 8 and November 13, 2005. Fourth-seeded Amélie Mauresmo won the singles event, the first French player to win the title, and she earned $1,000,000 first-prize money as well as 485 ranking points.

Justine Henin-Hardenne had qualified for the tournament but withdrew due to a hamstring injury.

finals

Singles

 Amélie Mauresmo defeated  Mary Pierce, 5–7, 7–6(7–3), 6–4.

Doubles

 Lisa Raymond /  Samantha Stosur defeated  Cara Black /  Rennae Stubbs, 6–7(5–7), 7–5, 6–4.

References

External links
 
 WTA Championships draws (PDF)

WTA Tour Championships
WTA Tour Championships
WTA Tour Championships
WTA Tour Championships
WTA Tour Championships
WTA Tour Championships
Sports competitions in Los Angeles
Tennis in Los Angeles
Tennis tournaments in California